is a passenger railway station  located in Kita-ku Kobe, Hyōgo Prefecture, Japan. It is operated by the private transportation company, Kobe Electric Railway (Shintetsu).

Lines

Station layout
The station consists of two ground-level unnumbered side platforms, connected to the station building by a level crossing.

Platforms

Adjacent stations

History
The station was opened on December 1, 1965.

Passenger statistics
In fiscal 2019, the station was used by an average of 3,113 passengers daily

Surrounding area
Hyogo Prefectural Road No. 15 Kobe Sanda Line (Arima Highway)
Kobe Municipal Hanayama Elementary School
Hanayama east housing complex

See also
List of railway stations in Japan
 Hanayama Funicular

References

External links 

 Official home page 

Railway stations in Kobe
Railway stations in Japan opened in 1965